Prince Aleksander Michał Lubomirski (1614–1677) was a Polish nobleman, aristocrat and the brother of controversial commander Jerzy Sebastian Lubomirski.

Lubomirski was the Deputy Cup-Bearer of the Queen from 1643 and Master of the Horse of the Polish Crown from 1645. In 1668 he became the Governor of Kraków Voivodeship, prior to being Starost of Sandomierz and Bydgoszcz.

He was owner of two castles (Wiśnicz and Rzemień), three towns, 120 villages, 57 folwarks and 7 starostwos.

1614 births
1677 deaths
Aleksander Michal Lubomirski (d. 1677)
Secular senators of the Polish–Lithuanian Commonwealth
Polish courtiers